Demon of the Sea is a lost 1931 film directed by Michael Curtiz and William Dieterle.

It is the German-language version of the American film Moby Dick. Such multiple-language versions were common in the early years of sound.

Cast
William Dieterle as Captain Ahab
Lissy Arna
Anton Pointner
Karl Etlinger
Philipp Lothar Mayring
Bert Sprotte

External links

1931 films
Films of the Weimar Republic
Films directed by Michael Curtiz
Films directed by William Dieterle
Warner Bros. films
Films based on Moby-Dick
German multilingual films
American multilingual films
Lost American films
German black-and-white films
American black-and-white films
1931 drama films
American drama films
German drama films
1931 multilingual films
1931 lost films
Lost drama films
1930s German-language films
1930s American films
1930s German films